Molla Kola (also Romanized as Mollā Kolā) is a village in Baladeh Kojur Rural District, in the Central District of Nowshahr County, Mazandaran Province, Iran. At the 2006 census, its population was 436, in 102 families.

References 

Populated places in Nowshahr County